HMS Tapir (P335) was a Second World War British T-class submarine, built by Vickers-Armstrong in Barrow-in-Furness.  So far she has been the only ship of the Royal Navy to bear the name Tapir, after the animal.

Career

As HMS Tapir
The submarine was laid down on 29 March 1943, and launched on 21 August 1944. Commissioned into the Royal Navy on 30 December of that year, she led a distinguished career for such a late entry into the war, torpedoing the German submarine U-486 in the North Sea, to the north-west of Bergen, Norway at position  on 12 April 1945.

HNLMS Zeehond

On 18 June 1948, she was deemed surplus to requirements, and was loaned to the Netherlands for a period of five years, being commissioned into the Royal Netherlands Navy as HNLMS Zeehond (P335) on 12 July 1948. Together with O24 and HNLMS Van Kinsbergen, she visited Curaçao in 1949. Gravity measurements were taken during the trip (the first Dutch ones following the war) and the Zeehond conducted a long snorkel trip on the way back. She was transferred back to the Royal Navy on 15 July 1953, finally being re-commissioned and renamed Tapir on 16 December of that year.

HMS Tapir was scrapped at Faslane in December 1966.

References

 
 

 

British T-class submarines of the Royal Navy
Ships built in Barrow-in-Furness
1944 ships
World War II submarines of the United Kingdom
Zwaardvisch-class submarines
Cold War submarines of the United Kingdom